Ozyornoye (Bulandık) is a rural locality (a selo) in Ongudaysky District, the Altai Republic, Russia. The population was 261 as of 2016. There are 5 streets.

Geography 
Ozyornoye is located 50 km northwest of Onguday (the district's administrative centre) by road. Tenga is the nearest rural locality.

References 

Rural localities in Ongudaysky District